The Lebanese State Security or Amn Eddawla (Official name: General Directorate of State Security) is the Lebanese National Security Agency, directly attached to both, the Lebanese President and Prime Minister.

The General Directorate of the Lebanese State Security was established in 1985. In March 2017, General Tony Saliba was appointed as director of the State Security in replacement of George Qaraa. Both are Melkite Greek catholics as the position is traditionnaly reserved to the community.

Functions

Major function required by the Agency:

 Collecting information concerning internal state security by the means of special networks covering the Lebanese territories, in order to remit them to the relevant authorities.
 Surveillance of Lebanese parties actions and foreign activists in what concerns state security.
 Counter-espionage and countering enemy activities in its different aspects.
 Preliminary investigations of acts which put at risk internal and external state security.
 Coordinating with other security services, such as the General Directorate of General Security, Internal Security Forces and Army Intelligence Directorate, in matters concerning inquiries and information exchange.
 Setting regular reports in order to inform the Supreme Council of Defense, about general security and political situation, and to make appropriate suggestions in order to face internal and external dangers; to permanently inform the President and the Prime Minister about security and political situation.
 Providing security to some VIP and to competent authorities which are menaced by danger.

Divisions

The Lebanese State Security is mainly divided into several parts:
	 	
 The Director General
 The Deputy Director General
 The Office of Director General
 The Planning Division ( شعبة التخطيط والتنظيم )
 Eight Regional Directorates ( مديريات اقليمية )
 The Security Division ( الشعبة الأمنية )
 The Intelligence Gathering Division ( شعبة المعلومات )
 The Public Sector Organizations Security ( فرع أمن المؤسسات )
 The Internal Security Division ( فرع أمن الدولة الداخلي )
 The External Security Division ( فرع أمن الدولة الخارجي )
 the Personnel Division (شعبة العديد)
 The Protection and Response Division (شعبة الحماية و التدخل)
 Along with other sub-divisions.

See also

 Lebanese Armed Forces
 General Security Directorate (Lebanon)
 Internal Security Forces

References

External links
 Lebanese State Security Official Website
			
	

Lebanese governmental organisations
Lebanese intelligence agencies